Mansour Ebrahimzadeh (born 29 May 1956 in Isfahan) is an Iranian retired football player and former manager of Sepahan.

Early life
He was born on 29 May 1956 in Isfahan, Iran. He graduated from Isfahan University.

Playing career

Youth career
He began playing football in 1973 in Sepahan. Then he played for Isfahan XI between 1974 and 1975.

Bank Melli
He joined the Bank Melli in 1975 and left that club in 1977 after two years.

Sepahan
He returned to Sepahan in 1977 and played for the club until 1979. He scored ten goals in fifty two matches. He retired from playing football on May 9, 1979 after a match against Persepolis.

Coaching career

Early years

After Nasser Hejazi became head coach of Zob Ahan in December 1998, he named Ebrahimzadeh as his assistant. Ebrahimzadeh was a trainer in the club in the last years. Hejazi left the club in December 2001, but Ebrahimzadeh kept his position in the club under the new head coach Bahram Atef. After Atef resigned as the club's head coach, Ebrahimzadeh left the club to become Sepahan's assistant head coach. He returned to Zob Ahan in summer 2003. He stayed in Zob Ahan until Sepahan appointed him as assistant head coach for a second time in June 2006.

In July 2002, Ebrahimzadeh left Zob Ahan and returned to his former club. Sepahan won the Iran Pro League in the 2002–03 season. Sepahan's head coach, Farhad Kazemi proposed another assistant to the club and Ebrahimzadeh resigned after it. On 1 June 2006, Luka Bonačić became head coach of Sepahan and Ebrahimzadeh was named as one of his assistants. Bonačić gave more power to Ebrahimzadeh as the other assistants. He also led Zob Ahan in the 2007 Hazfi Cup Final Second Leg when Bonačić traveled to his country for personal reasons. He resigned after becoming the caretaker manager of the Iran national football team.

In 2007, after Amir Ghalenoie became head coach of the national football team, Ebrahimzadeh was appointed as one of his assistants along with Afshin Peyrovani. He kept his position in Sepahan as assistant head coach. He was a member of coaching staff in the 2007 AFC Asian Cup.

After Ghalenoie's dismissal as head coach, Ebrahimzadeh was named as caretaker head coach and led three matches which were all drawn. After Javier Clemente traveled to Iran to become the new head coach of the national team, Ebrahimzadeh was named as assistant again but Clemente refused to become Iran national team's head coach and left Iran. Ali Daei was named as new head coach but he was not belief Ebrahimzadeh.

Appointment as head coach of Zob Ahan
He was chosen as the head coach of Zob Ahan in summer 2008 and won the Hazfi Cup in his first season and finished second in the league where he lost the trophy on the final week of the season. He finished second again in his second season and also qualified to the finals of ACL but was defeated and became runner up. He finished the 2010-11 Persian Gulf Cup in third position with Zob Ahan. Zob Ahan failed to replay their last year's good results in the AFC Champions League and failed to reach the semifinal. He was later named as 16th best coach in the world by the IFFHS in 2010. On 6 May 2012, he announced that he would leave Zob Ahan at the end of season.

Naft Tehran
On 28 May 2012, he signed a one-year contract with Naft Tehran. He started successfully at his new team, leading them to fifth place at the end of the season, with one point behind Foolad which qualified them for the champions league. He was offered a contract to extend his contract with the club, which he refused to sign.

Rah Ahan
He was named as Rah Ahan's head coach for the 2013–14 season after coming to an agreement with the club. He was previously linked to Tractor Sazi, Persepolis and Saba Qom. He officially signed his contract on 1 June 2013. His first match as head coach of Rah Ahan was a 0–0 draw over Mes Kerman. He led Rah Ahan to 11th place and left the team at the end of the season, when the club faced ownership problems.

Paykan
Ebrahimzadeh became head coach of Paykan on 1 June 2014, replacing Farhad Kazemi. However, he was sacked on 25 November 2014 after five months.

Mes Kerman
He was the head coach of Mes Kerman form Azadegan League in 2016–2017 season.

Sepahan
Mansour Ebrahimzadeh was appointed as the head coach of Sepahan on January 27, 2018.

Statistics

Honours

Club

Zob Ahan
 AFC Champions League Runner-Up: 2010
 Iran Pro League Runner-Up: 2008–09, 2009–10
 Hazfi Cup: 2008–09

Individual
IFFHS 16th best coach in the world: 2010, 2011

References

External links
PersianLeague.com – Ebrahimzadeh among The World's best Coach of the 21st Century
goal.com
Aftab

1956 births
Sportspeople from Isfahan
Living people
Iran national football team managers
Zob Ahan Esfahan F.C. managers
Iranian football managers
Persian Gulf Pro League managers